The Gold Coast Rollers are a defunct basketball team from Gold Coast, Queensland that competed in the National Basketball League (NBL).

The team entered the NBL in 1990 as the Gold Coast Cougars, but for the 1991 season, they were renamed the Rollers. The team was one of only two teams from the state of Queensland when it first joined the NBL (the Brisbane Bullets being the other). The Rollers were one of three teams (the Geelong Supercats and the Hobart Devils being the other two) that had their NBL licences revoked by the league following the 1996 season due to financial difficulties.

Honour roll

Season by season

References

Basketball teams established in 1990
Basketball teams in Queensland
Defunct National Basketball League (Australia) teams
Gold Coast Rollers
1996 disestablishments in Australia
1990 establishments in Australia
Basketball teams disestablished in 1996
Sporting teams based on the Gold Coast, Queensland